Amenze Aighewi  (born 21 November 1991) is a Nigerian footballer who played as a forward for the Nigeria women's national football team. She was part of the team at the 2011 FIFA Women's World Cup. On club level she plays for Rivers Angels in Nigeria.

References

External links
 

1991 births
Living people
Rivers Angels F.C. players
Nigeria women's international footballers
Place of birth missing (living people)
2011 FIFA Women's World Cup players
Women's association football forwards
Nigerian women's footballers